The Nolasco leaf-toed gecko (Phyllodactylus nolascoensis) is a medium-sized gecko. It is found on San Pedro Nolasco Island in Mexico.

References

nolascoensis
Reptiles of Mexico
Reptiles described in 1964
Taxa named by James R. Dixon